Horne Creek Farm is a historical farm near Pinnacle, Surry County, North Carolina. The farm is a North Carolina State Historic Site that belongs to the North Carolina Department of Natural and Cultural Resources, and it is operated to depict farm life in the northwest Piedmont area .  The historic site includes the late 19th century Hauser Farmhouse, which has been furnished to reflect the 1900-1910 era, along with other supporting structures.  The farm raised animal breeds that were common in the early 20th century.  The site also includes the Southern Heritage Apple Orchard, which preserves about 800 trees of about 400 heritage apple varieties.  A visitor center includes exhibits, a gift shop and offices.

The State Historic Site regularly hosts special events, which focus on farm life and techniques from the early 20th century, and include sheep shearing, corn shucking, ice cream socials, heritage crafts, music and pie baking.

The farmhouse was built about 1880, and is a two-story, three-bay, single-pile log building with weatherboard sheathing and a wood-shingled gable roof.  Also on the property are the contributing double-crib log barn, wellhouse/washhouse, log smokehouse, log tobacco barn, corncrib, a fruit house and family cemetery.  A reconstructed fruit and vegetable drying house was placed where the original once stood.

It was listed on the National Register of Historic Places in 2002.

See also
Open-air museum

References

External links
 

Museums in Surry County, North Carolina
Farm museums in North Carolina
History museums in North Carolina
North Carolina State Historic Sites
Farms on the National Register of Historic Places in North Carolina
Open-air museums in North Carolina
National Register of Historic Places in Surry County, North Carolina
Log houses in the United States
Living museums in North Carolina
Houses completed in 1880
Buildings and structures in Surry County, North Carolina
Log buildings and structures on the National Register of Historic Places in North Carolina